Qualification for the 2002 Little League World Series took place in sixteen different parts of the world during July and August 2002, with formats and number of teams varying by region.

Asia

The tournament took place in Manila, Philippines from July 28–August 4.

Canada

The tournament was held in Lethbridge, Alberta from August 2–11.

Caribbean

The tournament took place in St. Croix, United States Virgin Islands from July 26–August 4.

Europe, Middle East and Africa

The tournament took place in Kutno, Poland from July 4–14.

Great Lakes

The tournament took place in Indianapolis, Indiana from August 1–10.

Latin America

The tournament took place in Managua, Nicaragua from July 27–August 4.

Mexico

The tournament took place in Monterrey, Nuevo León from July 19–29.

Mid-Atlantic Region

The tournament took place in Bristol, Connecticut from August 3–13.

Midwest

The tournament took place in Indianapolis, Indiana from August 2–11.

New England

The tournament was held in Bristol, Connecticut from August 3–12.

Northwest

The tournament was held in San Bernardino, California from August 2–12.

Pacific

The tournament took place in Manila, Philippines from July 28–August 4.

Southeast

The tournament took place in St. Petersburg, Florida from August 3–10.

Southwest

The tournament took place in Waco, Texas from August 5–11.

Transatlantic

The tournament was held in Kutno, Poland from August 3–10.

West

The tournament took place in San Bernardino, California from August 2–13.

External links
2002 Little League World Series website

Little League World Series
2002 in softball